Rosario Pisani (La Calle, 1880 – Fez, 1952), was a French Captain of Northern African descent who fought against the Ottoman Empire in World War I.  Pisani's force would grow into what would become the Arab Northern Army and he was one of the most successful raiders during the Arab Revolt.

French forces in the Arab Revolt

The French military mission in charge of fighting the Ottoman Empire was commanded by Colonel Édouard Brémond. 
A French officer, Pisani, had arrived from Morocco to command 200 North African soldiers in the Arab Uprising. This force had Arabic-speaking junior officers volunteers who were mostly born in North Africa as well as another 12 officers that were French specialists. In the book Setting the Desert on Fire the author quoted a British officer as saying Pisani was a "brigand disguised unconvincingly as a French officer."

On 27 September 1917, Lawrence set off for another raid on the Hejaz railway. He took Captain Pisani hoping to train him and some Syrians to take over these raids as they took up a lot of time. Lawrence found it exhausting play tribal mediator. During this raid, he settled "twelve cases of assault, four camel-thefts, one marriage settlement, fourteen feuds, two evil eyes, and a bewitchment."

After the First World War

During the fighting against the Ottomans, Feisal took a liking to Pisani and asked him to come to the Paris Peace Conference to advise him alongside T. E. Lawrence aka Lawrence of Arabia.

See also

Arab Revolt

Bibliography 
Notes

References 
 - Total pages: 384

 - Total pages: 469
 - Total pages: 256
 - Total pages: 96
 - Total pages: 1188

1880 births
1952 deaths
French military personnel of World War I
People of French West Africa
French military personnel of the Franco-Turkish War
People of the Franco-Syrian War
Recipients of the Distinguished Service Medal (US Army)